Lionel Mpasi-Nzau (born 1 August 1994) is a professional footballer who plays as goalkeeper for Rodez AF. Born in France, he plays for the DR Congo national team.

Professional career
A youth product of PSG, Mpasi signed his first professional contract with Toulouse before moving to Rodez in 2016. Mpasi made his professional debut with Rodez in a 0-0 Ligue 2 tie with Le Mans FC on 14 February 2020.

International career
Mpasi was born in France, and is of Congolese descent. He is a former youth international for France. However, he decided to represent the home country of his parents, DR Congo. Being selected without appearing on the pitch, he finally debuted for the DR Congo national team in a 1–0 friendly loss to Bahrain on 1 February 2022.

References

External links
 
 FFF Profile

1994 births
Living people
People from Meaux
Democratic Republic of the Congo footballers
Democratic Republic of the Congo international footballers
French footballers
France youth international footballers
French sportspeople of Democratic Republic of the Congo descent
Association football goalkeepers
Rodez AF players
Ligue 2 players
Championnat National players
Championnat National 2 players
Championnat National 3 players
Black French sportspeople